The Choctaw Horse is a horse breed from the state of Mississippi in the United States that was originally used by the Choctaw tribe of Native Americans. To the Choctaw, this particular breed of horse was symbolic of wealth, glory, honor, and prestige. They were also used for barter. This breed is rare.

Characteristics
They closely resemble Mustangs. They are stocky, strong, and have great stamina. Their heads have a straight profile. They have full manes and tails.

Uses
They are very "cowy" horses, meaning that they have great cow sense and excel when working with cattle. They are smart, energetic horses and are strong and sturdy enough to be pack horses. They are very agile, making them suitable for the faster western events.

References

The Complete Illustrated Encyclopedia of Horses and Ponies by Catherine Austen, Sarah Gorrie, Pippa Roome, and Nicola Jane Swinney published by Flame Tree Publishing, 2008

External links
 Sponenberg article
 Kerr Center for Sustainable Agriculture
 ALBC
 Southwest Spanish Mustang Association

Choctaw culture
Horse breeds
Horse breeds originating in the United States
Native American culture
Native American history of Mississippi